John Carl "Jack" Rudnay (born November 20, 1947) is a former professional American football center in the National Football League. He played his entire 13-year career with the Kansas City Chiefs.

Early life
Rudnay graduated in 1965 from Kenston High School in Geauga County southeast of Cleveland. He graduated from Northwestern University in Evanston, Illinois in 1969. While at Northwestern, He became a member of the Sigma Chi fraternity.

Professional football career
A fourth-round draft choice in 1969 for the American Football League's Kansas City Chiefs, Rudnay missed the Chiefs' championship season as a result of a back injury suffered in the College All-Star Game following his senior year at Northwestern, where he had played both center and defensive tackle.

Though drafted to an AFL team, he never played in an American Football League game, his first season being 1970, after the Chiefs joined the NFL.  He went on to play 144 straight games and 178 games in all with the Chiefs, the third most ever by a Kansas City offensive lineman, and was regarded as one of the finest centers in the National Football League during the 1970s. He was the American Football Conference's starting center in the Pro Bowl following the 1973–1976 seasons.

Business career
Rudnay has served as the Chief Executive Officer of the Stone Manufacturing and Supply Company, a Kansas City-based veterinarians equipment and supply company.

References

See also
Other American Football League players

1947 births
Living people
Players of American football from Cleveland
American football centers
Northwestern Wildcats football players
Kansas City Chiefs players
American Conference Pro Bowl players